A. formosa may refer to:

 Aliciella formosa, a phlox endemic to New Mexico
 Alsophila formosa, a tree fern
 Amandava formosa, an estrildid finch
 Anas formosa, a dabbling duck
 Angaria formosa, a sea snail
 Aplysiopsis formosa, a sea slug
 Aquilegia formosa, a wildflower native to western North America
 Aranea formosa, an orb-web spider